The X166 GL-Class is a full-sized luxury SUV produced by Mercedes-Benz, from 2006 to 2015.

Development and launch 
The X164 GL-Class debuted at the 2006 North American International Auto Show, and deliveries commenced on September in Europe. Around US$600,000,000 was invested in the Mercedes Alabama plant in preparation for the production of vehicles including the X164 GL-Class.

Unlike most three-row luxury SUVs at the time, the GL-Class is based on an elongated and widened version of the M-Class platform, instead of the body-on-frame construction found on vehicles such as the Lexus LX and Cadillac Escalade.

GL500 models are badged as GL550 in the United States.

Equipment 
All models feature leather electric seats, an automatic climate control system, 19-inch alloy wheels, 4MATIC all-wheel drive, air suspension (adjustable by up to 307 mm), and a 7-speed 7G-Tronic automatic transmission. GL-Class models are also optionally available with a tyre pressure monitoring system, DAB digital radio, reversing camera, and rear seat infotainment screens. Grand Edition models were also offered from 2011, and feature a redesigned front bumper, taller grille with three slats, 20-inch AMG alloy wheels, bi-xenon headlamps, and a two-tone interior.

Models

Petrol engines

Diesel engines

Model year changes

2009 facelift 
The following changes apply for models produced since June 2009:

 Exterior design changes including: redesigned radiator grille, foglights, bumpers, wing-mirrors, and LED headlights and tail-lights
 Interior design changes including: redesigned seats and steering wheel
 Addition of Tenorite Grey and Palladium Silver exterior colour options
 All diesel models now receive urea-injection in exhaust system (BlueTEC), to meet 50-state emissions requirement
 Introduction of GL350 CDI BlueTec, GL320 CDI model rebadged as GL350 CDI, and GL420 CDI rebadged as GL450 CDI

2010 
 GL350 CDI engine updated and GL450 CDI ends production

2011 
 Introduction of Grand Edition model for GL450 and GL350 CDI BlueTec

Sales figures 
The following are the sales figures for the X164 GL-Class:
Note: 2012 sales figures include the next generation model.

Awards 
 2007 MotorTrend “SUV of the Year”
 2008 Car and Driver "10 Best Trucks and SUVs" award
 2011 AutoPacific "Motorist Choice Award" in the SUV category

References 

GL-Class (X164)
Cars introduced in 2006
Luxury sport utility vehicles
All-wheel-drive vehicles